is a passenger railway station  located in the city of Yonago, Tottori Prefecture, Japan. It is operated by the West Japan Railway Company (JR West).

Lines

Station layout
The station consists of one ground-level side platform located on the right side of the tracks when facing in the direction of Sakaiminato. The station is unattended.

History
Wadahama Station opened on November 1, 1951.

Passenger statistics
In fiscal 2018, the station was used by an average of 200 passengers daily.

Surrounding area
Wadahama Industrial Park
Japan Racing Association (JRA) Winds Yonago (Off-course betting facilities of JRA)

See also
List of railway stations in Japan

References

External links 

  Wadahama Station from JR-Odekake.net 

Railway stations in Japan opened in 1951
Railway stations in Tottori Prefecture
Stations of West Japan Railway Company
Yonago, Tottori